Fadogiella is a small genus of flowering plants in the family Rubiaceae. It was described by Walter Robyns in 1928.

Distribution
It is found in Central and East Tropical Africa: Democratic Republic of the Congo, Tanzania, Angola, Malawi, and Zambia.

Bacterial leaf symbiosis
Endophytic bacteria are housed in the intercellular space of the leaf mesophyll tissue. The presence of these bacteria can only be microscopically ascertained. The bacteria are identified as Burkholderia, which is a genus that is also found in the leaves of other Rubiaceae species. The hypothesis is that these endophytic bacteria provide chemical protection against insect herbivory.

Taxonomy
This genus is morphologically similar to and related to Fadogia, but Fadogiella is (3-)4-5 locular, while Fadogia is 3-4(-5) locular.

Species
 Fadogiella cana (K.Schum.) Robyns
 Fadogiella rogersii (Wernham) Bridson
 Fadogiella stigmatoloba (K.Schum.) Robyns

References

External links 
World Checklist of Rubiaceae

Rubiaceae genera
Vanguerieae
Taxa named by Frans Hubert Edouard Arthur Walter Robyns